Perraud is a surname. Notable people with the surname include:

Adolphe Perraud (1828–1906), French Cardinal and academician
Florent Perraud (born 1982), French footballer
Jean-Joseph Perraud (1819-1876), French sculptor
Jean-Marc Perraud, French businessman
Romain Perraud (born 1997), French footballer